Sons of Ram is a 2012 Indian animated film created by ACK Animation Studios, and co-produced by Maya Digital Studios and  Cartoon Network India. Based on Hindu mythology, it depicts the sons of Rama, Luv and Kush. It is Amar Chitra Katha's first animated feature film in stereoscopic 3D. It was released to theatres in India on 2 November 2012.

The film was screened at the Toronto Animation Arts festival (TAAFI) in 2013. The film premiered on television on Cartoon Network (India).

Story
Surayavanshi Ram of Ayodhya, the greatest warrior king that ever lived and the main character of the Ramayana, was forced to send his beloved wife Sita into exile, thus leading him and his kingdom to despair and towards an empty future.

Unknown to Ram, far away in sage Valmiki's hermitage, Sita lives as Vandevi, raising their twin sons, Luv & Kush. Though not aware of their lineage, the twins imbibe wisdom, compassion and combat skills that would put any royal prince to shame.

Sita teaches Luv -Kush to always work as a team, secretly hoping that her estranged family would find a way to come together one day. The twins must conquer their inner demons before they can achieve their destinies.

Accompanied by a steadfast gang of their lovable friends, Luv-Kush's journey takes them from enchanted forests with mythical creatures to the revered land of Ayodhya, the home of their fabled heroes.

Voice cast
 Aditya Kapadia - Luv
 Devansh Doshi - Kush
 Saptrishi Ghosh -Ram
Sunidhi Chauhan - Sita
 Raj Bhuva - Bheelu
 Ettienne Couthino - Valmiki
 Sanjeev Vrika  - Laxman
 Damandeep Singh Baggan as Shatrughna
 Chetan Sharma as Hanuman and Vishvamitra

Production

See also
List of Indian animated feature films

References

External links
 
 

2012 films
2012 animated films
Indian animated films
Cartoon Network (Indian TV channel)
Hindu mythological films
Animated films based on Ramayana
Films set in Uttar Pradesh
Films based on Indian comics
Animated films based on comics